PS Gracie Fields built in 1936, was the last  paddle steamer built for Red Funnel as a ferry and excursion steamer. She ran on the Southampton-Cowes route until the outbreak of World War II, when she was requisitioned and served as HMS Gracie Fields as a minesweeper. After successfully evacuating troops from the Dunkirk beaches, she was seriously damaged by an aircraft bomb on 29 May 1940, and sank the following morning.

Design and construction
Laid down as Yard No.1149 by John I. Thornycroft & Company at Woolston for The Southampton, Isle of Wight and South of England Royal Mail Steam Packet Company Limited, known as Red Funnel, the paddle steamer Gracie Fields had a tonnage of 396 GRT. To increase manouverability when going astern, she was fitted with a bow rudder. Accommodation for cars was provided on the fore deck.

Operation
She was launched by her namesake, the singer Gracie Fields, on 8 April 1936. After a cruise for invited guests on 9 May, she entered revenue service the following day. During the rest of 1936, she undertook a couple of special cruises in conjunction with her sponsor.

Royal Navy service
At the beginning of the Second World War she was requisitioned by the Admiralty and served as a minesweeper. On 29 May 1940, the ship took part in the Dunkirk evacuation, rescuing 280 troops on the first trip. However, on the second trip, with 750 men on board, she was attacked by German aircraft resulting in the loss of eight on board, the survivors having been picked up by warships. HMS Pangbourne attempted to tow the damaged vessel back to England but Gracie Fields sank in the night.

References

External links
Simplon postcards

1936 ships
Dunkirk evacuation
Ferry transport on the Isle of Wight
Little Ships of Dunkirk
Maritime incidents in May 1940
Paddle steamers of the United Kingdom
Ships sunk by German aircraft
World War II shipwrecks in the English Channel